Ragle Glacier is a small glacier that drains the west end of the Fosdick Mountains, between Mount Ferranto and Mount Avers, which flows northwest to Block Bay, in Marie Byrd Land. The glacier was photographed by the United States Antarctic Service (USAS) (1939–41), led by Admiral Byrd, and was mapped by the United States Geological Survey (USGS) from surveys and U.S. Navy air photos (1959–65). Named for Dr. B. Harrison Ragle, Admiral Byrd's personal physician in the late 1930s, who made financial contributions toward purchase of first aid equipment and medical supplies for USAS (1939–41) and was a consultant on medical matters for that expedition.

References

Glaciers of Marie Byrd Land